Naci Özgüç (born 1964) is a Turkish conductor. He is chief conductor of the Ankara State Opera and Ballet Orchestra of the Turkish State Opera and Ballet. His mother is the soprano and voice instructor at the State Conservatory Müfide Özgüç.

He premiered Fazıl Say's Nazım and Turgay Erdener's operettas İstanbulname and Mi’den Dört Bölüm. His discography includes a recording of Ahmed Adnan Saygun's Oratorium Yunus Emre with Jugendchor Osnabrück, and the Osnabrück SO, for the DreyerGaido label in 2011.

References

1964 births
Living people
Turkish conductors (music)
21st-century conductors (music)